Ernstichthys intonsus is a species of banjo catfish that is endemic to Ecuador where it is found in the Napo River basin.

References 

 

Aspredinidae
Freshwater fish of Ecuador
Fish described in 1985